Saiye may refer to:

Saiye, Burma, a village in Ye Township, Mon State, Burma
Saiye, Ghana or Saive, a settlement in Ghana

See also
Saiyed, an honorific title